Brian Letscher is an American actor, best known as Secret Service Agent Tom in ABC's Scandal.

Personal life
Letscher was born in Grosse Pointe, Michigan, the middle brother of actor Matt Letscher and entrepreneur Aaron Letscher. He attended college at the University of Michigan in Ann Arbor, Michigan and graduated in economics. He played football for the Michigan Wolverines football team.

Acting
Brian moved to New York City to pursue acting and after joining Public Theater Shakespeare Lab, he landed roles in films Kate & Leopold,  Slippery Slope and Puccini for Beginners. He also had small roles in television Law & Order: Criminal Intent and Law & Order: Special Victims Unit and theatre Burning Blue. Brian also began working with The Purple Rose Theatre in Chelsea, Michigan. He played the lead role of Bo Decker in William Inge's Bus Stop and the production earned The Detroit Free Press' "Best Play" award. Brian became a produced playwright when The Purple Rose developed and produced a full equity run of his first play, "When The Lights Come On", about his experiences in the world of college football. Having been shifted to Los Angeles eight years ago, Brian has appeared in over two dozen television shows, most notably SCANDAL and CW's VALOR, and has become a member of The Pacific Residents Theatre Company, Rogue Machine as well as continuing to write and develop his own work.

Writing
Brian has written multiple plays, having his first one "When The Lights Come On" produced by actor Jeff Daniels' The Purple Rose Theatre Company in Chelsea, MI. His next play, "Smart Love", world premiered at The Purple Rose in January 2017. "Smart Love" then had its West Coast Premiere at Pacific Resident Theatre in Venice, CA and received a "Critic's Choice" nod from the LA Times.

Filmography

References

External links
 

20th-century American male actors
21st-century American male actors
American dramatists and playwrights
American male film actors
Year of birth missing (living people)
American male stage actors
American male television actors
Living people
Male actors from Michigan
People from Grosse Pointe, Michigan
University of Michigan College of Literature, Science, and the Arts alumni
Michigan Wolverines football players